= John M. Otto =

John Matthew Otto (9 November 1714 – 9 August 1785/1793) was a German-born physician.

Born in Meiningen in Germany, Otto studied medicine in Augsburg before moving to Pennsylvania. Landing in Bethlehem in 1750, he began working as a physician, surgeon, chemist, and pharmacist on the Moravian settlement there. His services were sought after as far as Philadelphia and he became well known in the scientific circles there, leading to his election to the American Philosophical Society in 1769.

He married Joanna M. Dressler and Maria Schmidt. With Joanna, he fathered three children: Sophia (died age 2), Rebecca (1765–1828), and Sophia Magdelene (1769–1810). He is buried at the Moravian Cemetery in Bethlehem, Pennsylvania.
